Deep South Wrestling (DSW) is a professional wrestling promotion in the state of Georgia. Deep South worked in tandem with World Wrestling Entertainment (WWE) as a developmental territory from September 1, 2005, until April 18, 2007. Deep South was owned by Jody Hamilton, former director of the WCW Power Plant.

First run (1986–1988)
Jody Hamilton and Bill Behrens founded Deep South Wrestling in 1986 as a wrestling promotion and training facility, setting their base of operations in Lovejoy, Georgia. They had ties with both the American Wrestling Association and the National Wrestling Alliance. After a career-ending back injury in October 1988, Hamilton folded the promotion and focused on his wrestling school, which by 1989, evolved into the WCW Power Plant.

Second run (2005–2007)
In 2005, WWE decided to run a developmental territory in the Atlanta, Georgia area and hired Hamilton to run the territory and resurrect the Deep South Wrestling promotion after seventeen years of inactivity and set their base of operations in nearby McDonough, Georgia.

Deep South Wrestling held their inaugural show under the WWE banner on September 1, 2005. Two months later, the promotion crowned Mike Mizanin as their first Deep South Heavyweight Champion. The promotion gained a timeslot on Comcast Sports South on Sunday nights at 11:30 p.m.

On July 9, 2006, the promotion debuted a live event at Six Flags Over Georgia in Austell, Georgia. It was announced that DSW would begin performing live shows at venues other than Six Flags, starting in the nearby town of Griffin, Georgia. On May 18, High Impact (Mike Taylor & Tony Santarelli) won a tournament to crown the first Deep South Tag Team Champions. It was announced on October 18, 2006, that Deep South Wrestling had landed a television deal with MAVTV.

On April 18, 2007, WWE announced that they were ending its relationship with Deep South. Deep South confirmed the cancellation of their April 19, 2007 television taping on their website. The closure of the promotion was announced on Deep South's website on April 19, although Deep South held its final event on April 12. Because of Deep South parting ways, talent not under WWE developmental contracts left the promotion. Those that remained under contract were reassigned to Ohio Valley Wrestling.

Third run (2021–present)
In February 2021, Hamilton's son Nick Patrick announced that he was reviving Deep South Wrestling, with Griffin, Georgia, as its new base of operations for the promotion and its training facility. On August 3, 2021, DSW founder Jody Hamilton died at the age of 82.

Champions

Authority figures

References

External links
Deep South Wrestling Title Histories
The Wrestling Follower Results Archive: Deep South Wrestling
Deep South Wrestling at Online World of Wrestling

Companies based in Clayton County, Georgia
Companies based in Henry County, Georgia
1986 establishments in Georgia (U.S. state)
Independent professional wrestling promotions based in Georgia (U.S. state)